The Sumba flycatcher (Ficedula harterti) is a species of bird in the family Muscicapidae.
It is endemic to Indonesia.

Its natural habitat is subtropical or tropical moist lowland forests.

References

Sumba flycatcher
Birds of Sumba
Sumba flycatcher
Taxonomy articles created by Polbot